Arturo Herbruger Asturias (3 June 1912 – 25 October 1999) was a Guatemalan politician. He served as Vice President of Guatemala from 18 June 1993 to 14 January 1996 in the cabinet of president Ramiro de León. He was elected by National Congress. He was previously head of the Supreme Electoral Tribunal from 1983 to 1993. 
Herbruger was also Attorney General, president of the Supreme Court. He was the Minister of Finance responsible for the treasury in 1948.

References

Vice presidents of Guatemala
1912 births
1999 deaths
Finance ministers of Guatemala
Guatemalan people of German descent
Government ministers of Guatemala